Lo que va de ayer a hoy is a 1945 Mexican fantasy comedy film directed by Juan Bustillo Oro and Paulino Masip. It stars
Enrique Herrera, Rosario Granados and Miguel Arenas.

References

External links
 

1945 films
1940s fantasy comedy films
Mexican black-and-white films
Mexican fantasy comedy films
1945 comedy films
1940s Mexican films